Odimumba Kwamdela, born J. Ashton Brathwaite (11 September 1942 – 16 January 2019), was a Barbadian-born writer who published 14 books of fiction, non-fiction, and poetry, and three musically dubbed spoken word albums.

Background
In 1960, while in his early teens, he left his native Barbados for London, England. He eventually enlisted in the British Army and served in the Middle East. After military service, he left London for Ontario, Canada. There he freelanced with Toronto newspapers before becoming founding publisher and editor of Spear Magazine, reputed to be the first Black magazine published in Canada. He once said, "I had big dreams of making Spear the Ebony of Canada."

Eventually becoming disappointed with what he saw as the limitation of Spear in a nation with too small a Black population and believing the "controversial" label given to the original edition of his book, Niggers...This is Canada, made him the object of governmental harassment, he exiled himself to New York City. There, during the Black Arts Movement of the mid-1970s, he made adopted the name Odimumba Kwamdela in place of his birth name.

Kwamdela taught in for the New York City Board of Education as a high-school teacher of Writing and Graphic Arts, serving for several years in the roughest schools in the world, one for adolescent offenders located in infamous, volatile Rikers Island Jail. He wrote a book detailing these experiences.

Selected works

 Black British Soldier (1969)
 Soul in the Wilderness (1970)
 Bitter Soul (1970)
 The Grassroots Philosopher (1970)
 N*ggers...This is Canada (1971)
 The Righteous Blackman (1972)
 Raining Ruins and Rockstones (1981)
 Blood-Boiling Black Blues (1983)
 Back to Penny Hole Forever (1997)
 Mighty Sparrow, Calypso King of the World (2006)
 Deception + Resentment + Racial Hatred + Anti-poor = POLITICS (PARTICULARLY In AMERICA) (2018)

References

External links 
 

20th-century Canadian male writers
20th-century Canadian novelists
20th-century Canadian short story writers
21st-century Canadian male writers
1942 births
2019 deaths
Barbadian emigrants to Canada
Barbadian male writers
Barbadian novelists
Barbadian poets
Black Canadian writers
Canadian male novelists
Canadian male short story writers
City University of New York alumni
Male poets
Naturalized citizens of Canada
Novelists from New York (state)
Writers from Toronto